The Special Department of Federal Revenue of Brazil, most commonly referred to as  (RFB) is the Brazilian federal revenue service agency and a secretariat of the Ministry of the Economy. The bureau has the role of administrating tax collection and the customs of Brazil. It also controls noncompliance, smuggling, piracy and drug trafficking.

References

Executive branch of Brazil
Revenue services
Government ministries of Brazil
Customs services